Marko Poletanović (born 20 July 1993) is a Serbian professional footballer who plays as a defensive midfielder for Ekstraklasa club Zagłębie Lubin.

Club career

Vojvodina
Born in Novi Sad, he played with the youth teams of Vojvodina through several age categories. He made his senior debut in the first half of the season 2011-12 when he was loaned to Serbian League Vojvodina side Cement Beočin. During the winter break he returned to Vojvodina. Despite the fact that at same time Vojvodina brought much older players such as Stephen Appiah and Almami Moreira to the squad in the midfield role, Poletanović managed to earn himself 12 appearances out of 15 matches during his first half season in the Serbian top flight.

Gent
On 21 January 2015, Poletanović signed a three-and-a-half year contract with Belgian Pro League club Gent. On 30 December 2015, news was released that he was going to be loaned out for six months to OH Leuven, however a few days later it became apparent that although both clubs had an agreement Poletanović did not want to move to OH Leuven and the deal was cancelled. Eventually, he was loaned to Zulte Waregem. In summer 2017, Poletanović mutually terminated the contract with the club and left as a free agent.

Red Star Belgrade
On June 22, 2016, he signed a one-year loan deal with Serbian giant, champions Red Star Belgrade, with option for permanent deal. Poletanović made his debut in an official match for Red Star on July 22, in the first round of the new season of the Superliga, in a draw against Napredak. Red Star manager Miodrag Božović praises his debut game. In his second game scored debut goal for Red Star against Metalac, in a win in the second championship round, with another good performance. After the end of season a loan spell expired and Poletanović left the club.

Tosno
On 19 August 2017, he signed a two-year contract with Russian Premier League club Tosno.

He played as Tosno won the 2017–18 Russian Cup final against Avangard Kursk on 9 May 2018 in the Volgograd Arena.

International career
Poletanović played for the Serbian under-17 and under-19 national youth teams. He made his international debut for Serbia in an friendly 3-0 loss to Qatar.

Career statistics

Club

International

Honours
Vojvodina
Serbian Cup: 2013–14

Gent
Division A: 2014–15

Tosno
Russian Cup: 2017–18

Raków Częstochowa
Polish Cup: 2020–21, 2021–22
 Polish Super Cup: 2021

References

External links
 
 Marko Poletanović stats at utakmica.rs 
 
 
 

1993 births
Living people
Footballers from Novi Sad
Serbian footballers
Serbia youth international footballers
Serbia under-21 international footballers
Serbian expatriate footballers
Association football midfielders
FK Vojvodina players
FK Cement Beočin players
K.A.A. Gent players
S.V. Zulte Waregem players
Red Star Belgrade footballers
FC Tosno players
Jagiellonia Białystok players
Raków Częstochowa players
Wisła Kraków players
Zagłębie Lubin players
Ekstraklasa players
II liga players
Serbian SuperLiga players
Belgian Pro League players
Russian Premier League players
Serbian expatriate sportspeople in Belgium
Serbian expatriate sportspeople in Russia
Serbian expatriate sportspeople in Poland
Expatriate footballers in Belgium
Expatriate footballers in Russia
Expatriate footballers in Poland
Serbia international footballers